Ammerndorf is a municipality  in the district of Fürth in Bavaria in Germany.

It has 2192 inhabitants.

References

Fürth (district)